A subgroup is an object in abstract algebra.

Subgroup may also refer to:
 a subdivision of a group
 a subgroup of a galaxy group
 a taxonomic rank between species and genus
 a unit of language classification within a language family (see also subgrouping) 
 a subgroup of a group (stratigraphy)